Tadahiko is a masculine Japanese given name. Notable people with the name include:

, Japanese photographer
, Japanese politician
, Japanese judge
, Japanese chemist
Tadahiko Ogawa, Japanese artist
, Japanese politician
, Japanese motorcycle racer
, Japanese footballer

Japanese masculine given names